is a metro station on the  Osaka Metro Nagahori Tsurumi-ryokuchi Line in Chūō-ku, Osaka, Japan.

Line
Osaka Metro Nagahori Tsurumi-ryokuchi Line (Station Number: N21)

Layout
There is an island platform fenced with platform gates between 2 tracks underground.

Surroundings

Osaka Business Park
TWIN 21
Fujitsu Kansai System Laboratory
the headquarters of Yomiuri Telecasting Corporation
Hotel New Otani Osaka
the headquarters of Sumitomo Life Insurance Company
Matsushita IMP Building
Crystal Tower
Castle Tower Building
Theater BRAVA
KDDI Osaka Building, etc.
Osaka-jo Hall
Osaka Castle

Chūō-ku, Osaka
Osaka Metro stations
Railway stations in Japan opened in 1996